Raoul Borra (14 August 1896 - 28 February 1988) was a French politician.

Borra was born in Bône, Algeria. He represented the French Section of the Workers' International (SFIO) in the Constituent Assembly elected in 1945, in the Constituent Assembly elected in 1946 and in the Chamber of Deputies from 1946 to 1951.

References

1896 births
1988 deaths
People from Annaba
People of French Algeria
Pieds-Noirs
French Section of the Workers' International politicians
Members of the Constituent Assembly of France (1945)
Members of the Constituent Assembly of France (1946)
Deputies of the 1st National Assembly of the French Fourth Republic